The Nepal Pratap Bhaskara is a decoration of Nepal. It is also called as the Nepal Decoration of Honour. It is the highest honour of Nepal given to only foreign monarchs and Nepalese ruling sovereign.

History 
It is instituted on 25 December 1966 by King Mahendra Bir Bikram Shah Dev.

Insignia
The ribbon of the order is blue with a white-edged red central stripe. It has a badge worn on the chest and one on the sash ribbon.

Grades
The Nepal Pratap Bhaskara has one grade: Member.
The decoration consists of the Sovereign (Parama-Nepal-Pratap-Bhaskara), Grand Master (Ati-Nepal-Pratap-Bhaskara), and ordinary members (Nepal-Pratap-Bhaskara). Conferred on members of the Nepalese and foreign Royal houses.

Recipients
 King Mahendra of Nepal (1966) 
 Queen Ratna of Nepal (1966)
 King Birendra of Nepal (1972)
 Queen Aishwarya of Nepal (1975)
 King Juan Carlos I of Spain (1983)
 King Bhumibol Adulyadej of Thailand (1986)
 Queen Sirikit of Thailand (1986)
 Queen Margrethe II of Denmark (1989)
 Crown Prince Dipendra of Nepal (1995)
 King Gyanendra of Nepal (2001)
 Queen Komal of Nepal (2001)

External links
 World Medals Index, Nepal: Nepal Pratap Bhaskara Decoration

References 

Pratap Bhaskara
Nepal Pratap Bhaskara
1966 establishments in Nepal